ProtoShare is a collaborative software tool from Astound Commerce, used for creating, reviewing, and refining website, mobile and web application prototypes. It enables individuals and companies to visualize project requirements by building website wireframes and application prototypes that team members and stakeholders can then review and comment on in real-time. ProtoShare is not a Flash tool; it uses HTML, CSS, and JavaScript. ProtoShare also helps development teams move from the waterfall method to the agile process through iterative development. It is available online as a SaaS (Software-as-a-Service) tool or as self-hosted for enterprise.

ProtoShare allows prototyping of websites and web and mobile apps by enabling developers to create true interactive experiences with a drag-and-drop WYSIWYG interface. Development teams can create low-fidelity, clickable wireframes then evolve them into high-fidelity prototypes with the use of Rich Internet Application (RIA) functionality, such as state creation, the custom HTML component, and CSS styles. Team members and clients can then collaborate on its evolution with real-time comments, ideas, and decisions. Once the process of prototyping and collaboration is finished, the development team has a strong visual specification to follow, reducing misunderstandings and rework in the programming stages. The visual specification can be exported to a Microsoft Word doc, as an archived HTML site, or to a web URL.

ProtoShare is browser-based software, compatible with multiple operating systems. Internet Explorer 10, the latest Firefox, the latest Safari, and the latest Chrome browsers on both Windows and macOS are supported in the Review section of the tool, which is where collaborators interact with and comment on prototypes. Mobile prototypes can also be linked to a handheld mobile device's browser for app simulation. The build and edit functionality of ProtoShare, where developers create the prototypes, is supported by the latest Firefox, Safari, and Chrome browsers on Windows and macOS.

Main sections of a ProtoShare project:
 Review – to experience / walkthrough the site, make comments, respond to discussion, track decisions, and for user testing
 Editor – for page, wireframe and prototype creation, editing, and annotating
 Library – where project templates, masters, and project assets are centrally located
 Export – for selecting and exporting any part of a project into a Microsoft Word, HTML file, or web URL

See also 
 Software Development Process
 User Interface Design
 Prototyping
 Collaborative software

References

External links 
 
 Mashable
 Website Magazine
 id8
 CNET
 AppAppeal
 Killer Startups

Collaborative software